A Youth worker is a person that works with young people to facilitate their personal, social and educational development through informal education, care (e.g. preventive) or leisure approaches. All types of educative approaches are not ethical for youth work, examples for unethical forms of education are  indoctrinating, inculcating, and brainwashing. Youth workers can work in many contexts and according to the roles they are known as enablers, facilitators, emancipators, animators or could be known by the set of activities they use to reach out to youth. The validity of youth work approaches are based on whether they are educational, participative, empowering, promotes equality of opportunities, etc. The basic principles of youth work are respecting young people, providing accessible and value oriented opportunities (genuinely useful) for voluntary participation, accountability, being anti-oppressive (e.g. social model of disability, unconscious bias training) in processes, confidentiality, reliability, trustworthiness, and being ethical in keeping boundaries.

In the UK and elsewhere, the main distinction is usually made between statutory, those who work as part of a government run initiative, and non-statutory, those that work in any other context.

See the article Youth work for a full explanation, and the article History of youth work for a brief time line. In some circumstances, the term should be carefully distinguished from Child and Youth Worker which refers to therapeutic work in the USA and Canada.

Tasks and duties of direct youth work practice
Engaging youth in participation and aiding youth in locating self is an important aspect of youth work practice. A youth worker needs to identify an "opening" for practice and be willing to make that opening into an "opportunity" by find resources to meet the needs of the work through various stakeholders. When the needs are met an "obligation" should be made to delivering the services and enabling participation of youth at a specific level, this obligation then becomes a part of the macro-system of services. Through participation the youth should be able to locate themselves, their strengths and limitations. Through participation the youth would be able to learn the skills, knowledge, attitudes, and values that they have through the relational experience and reflective observation, this leads them to further their growth opportunities.

Main tasks and duties of direct practice's are:

 Establish contact and build relationships.
 Bring contacted youths together in groups/ open events and shared activities.
 Enable participation of youth in activity planning (e.g. sports, arts, outdoors, etc.), project developing (community, educational, etc.), evaluation and review of activities.
 Address, advocate, and educate about youth issues, influences, and interests.
 Provide guidance (in locating self and growth opportunities), instruction (teaching & directing), personal & social education, mentoring and support.
 Collaborative development of community resources, facilities, and services.
 Manage and develop community programs and resources of an organization.

Functions of youth work
Merton, et al. in 2004 through a research report delineated the following as primary functions of youth work.

 Integrative: It is concerned with socialization of youth and introducing them to norms and expectations of society for directing them to social fitness, this has a preparation to adult world function.
 Reflexive: It is concerned with ensuring inclusion of youth perspectives in social institutions, this has an anti-oppressive function.
 Redistributive: It is concerned with ensuring social justice to youth and developing social capital for youth empowerment.

See also 
 Youth work
 Youth leaders
 Community youth workers
 Kolb's experiential learning

 List of youth empowerment organizations
 One World Youth Project
 International Youth Change Maker
 Positive youth development

References

Youth work